CMR Central is a shopping mall located at Maddilapalem, Visakhapatnam. It was developed by CMR Shopping Mall Private Limited.

Description
Renowned as one of the biggest malls in Visakhapatnam, CMR Central opened on 2 January 2010 with 6 floors of retail space. It has a built-up area of 72,000 square feet and is spread over 5 floors. From apparel to electronics to food to home furniture, CMR Central houses all major commodities. Located in Maddilapalem, CMR Central is one of the popular landmarks in Vizag that is located in the heart of the city. It contains outlets of major clothing and apparel brands, a gaming zone, a bowling alley, a large number of restaurants and even a four-screen multiplex cinema.

Entertainment 
Be it for shopping, or for watching movies, or for eating a wide variety of food, CMR Central is the favourite place to be for many citizens of Visakhapatnam. The mall has stores like Reliance Digital, Hometown, Spa, Levis, Max Fashion, Reliance Trends  KFC. Burger King, Pizza Hut and McDonald's. It includes 4 screens INOX.

Events
CMR Central has functioned as a venue for many events in the city. In the past, many popular celebrities like Sai Ramesh have graced this place. This mall has also hosted various music events like Battle of the Bands, charity events, fashion walks and beauty contests.

References

Shopping malls in Visakhapatnam
Shopping malls established in 2010
2010 establishments in Andhra Pradesh